Selo imeni Kirova is a rural locality (a selo) in Yuzhny Selsoviet, Kizlyarsky District, Republic of Dagestan, Russia. The population was 674 as of 2010. There are 9 streets.

Geography 
Selo imeni Kirova is located 2 km northwest of Kizlyar (the district's administrative centre) by road. Kizlyar and Krasnyy Voskhod are the nearest rural localities.

Nationalities 
Avars, Russians, Dargins, Kumyks, Azerbaijanis and Armenians live there.

References 

Rural localities in Kizlyarsky District